Fabrizio Ciano, 3rd Count of Cortellazzo and Buccari (1 October 1931 - 4 April 2008) was the son of Count Galeazzo Ciano and his wife Edda Mussolini, and grandson of Benito Mussolini. He is the author of the memoir Quando Il Nonno Fece Fucilare Papà ("When Grandpa had Daddy Shot"). He married Beatriz Uzcategui Jahn, without issue.

References

  
  

1931 births
2008 deaths
Counts of Italy
Italian memoirists
Italian nobility
20th-century memoirists
Mussolini family